The South American Women's Club Handball Championship, organized by the Pan-American Team Handball Federation, was the official competition for men's handball clubs of South Americas, and takes place every year. In 2003 or 2004 it was folded because of the dominance of the Brazilian teams. In 2016 the Pan American Women's Club Handball Championship was created.

Summary

Medal table

Per Club

Per Nation

References

External links
 www.panamhandball.org

Handball
Pan-American Team Handball Federation competitions
Women's handball competitions
Recurring sporting events established in 1984
Recurring sporting events disestablished in 2003
1984 establishments in South America